Abian may refer to:
Alexander Abian, mathematician
Chen Shui-bian, former President of Taiwan
Abian, Iran